Douglas Vincent may refer to:

 Douglas Vincent (cricketer) (born 1954), Scottish cricketer
 Douglas Vincent (Australian Army officer) (1916–1995), general in the Australian Army